The Bridge is a Canadian police drama commissioned by CTV starring Aaron Douglas. The name of the series is derived from the bridge which connects the wealthy Rosedale neighborhood of Toronto with one of its poorest, St. James Town.

Overview
Aaron Douglas' character, Frank Leo, is loosely based upon former Toronto Police Association head Craig Bromell.  After being unanimously elected head of the union, Leo sets out to end corruption in the force while working in the best interests of the rank-and-file.

Cast
Aaron Douglas as Frank Leo
Frank Cassini as Bernie Cantor
Inga Cadranel as Jill
Michael Murphy as Ed Wycoff
Ona Grauer as Abby St. James
Paul Popowich as Tommy Dunn
Theresa Joy as Billy
Brandon Ludwig as Bennie

Production and broadcast
The initial order was for 11 episodes, produced by Entertainment One.  After CTV ordered the pilot to series in November 2008, CTV later shared the pilot with CBS.  The series premiered on March 5, 2010 on CTV, and July 10, 2010 on CBS.  It was canceled in the United States after three episodes due to low ratings. CTV announced on June 3, 2010 that the series would return for a second season during the 2010–11 season.  However, on January 13, 2011, star Aaron Douglas tweeted that the series had been officially canceled after only one season.

The Bridge was produced by Entertainment One, 990 Multi Media Entertainment Company, and Jonsworth Productions.  It was announced that principal photography began on April 24, 2009.  The Bridge was originally commissioned as a two-hour movie and a backdoor pilot by CTV.

Episodes

Home media
On October 25, 2011, Entertainment One released The Bridge- Season 1, featuring all 13 episodes of the series, on DVD in Region 1.

Ratings

Canadian ratings

United States ratings

References

External links

2010 Canadian television series debuts
2010 Canadian television series endings
2010s Canadian crime drama television series
CTV Television Network original programming
Television shows set in Toronto
Television series by Entertainment One